Angewandte may refer to:

 Angewandte Chemie, a peer-reviewed chemistry journal
 University of Applied Arts Vienna, a university of higher education in Austria